First Methodist Church (First United Methodist Church; Methodist Episcopal Church of South Marshall) is a historic Methodist church at 300 E. Houston Street in Marshall, Texas.  It has also been known as First United Methodist Church and as Methodist Episcopal Church of South Marshall.  It is a stuccoed brick Greek Revival-style church with a portico having four monumental square columns;  such architecture is rare in Texas.

It was documented in 1936 by the Historic American Buildings Survey.  The portico was originally topped by a belfry but that was replaced in 1949 by a large octagonal cupola.  It was built during 1860 to 1861, probably by slave labor.  Its builders included mason Alexander Pope and carpenter Billingon Smalley.  It was expanded in 1949 and in 1958.

During the American Civil War, Confederate supplies were stored in the basement and it was the site of organization for the war effort.  It was the site of the first conference, in 1862, of the Trans-Mississippi states convened by Confederate President Jefferson Davis.  Texas Governor Lubbock, Missouri Governor Jackson, and representatives of Arkansas and Louisiana participated.

It was added to the National Register in 1980.

See also

National Register of Historic Places listings in Harrison County, Texas
Recorded Texas Historic Landmarks in Harrison County

References

External links

First United Methodist Church-Marshall from the Center for Regional Heritage Research, Stephen F. Austin State University

United Methodist churches in Texas
Churches on the National Register of Historic Places in Texas
Churches completed in 1860
19th-century Methodist church buildings in the United States
Buildings and structures in Harrison County, Texas
National Register of Historic Places in Harrison County, Texas
Recorded Texas Historic Landmarks